The Cuneiform Cliffs are steep, irregular cliffs at the south end of Malta Plateau, along the north side of the lower Mariner Glacier in Victoria Land. The name applied by the New Zealand Antarctic Place-Names Committee in 1966 is descriptive of wedgelike spurs that project from the face of the cliffs.

References
 

Cliffs of Victoria Land
Borchgrevink Coast